DeVon is a given name.

People bearing it include:

 DeVon Hardin (born 1986), American professional basketball player
 DeVon Walker (born 1985), American former indoor football player

See also 
 De'von Hall (born 1985), former American football player